The canton d'Apt is a French administrative division in the department of Vaucluse and region Provence-Alpes-Côte d'Azur.

Composition
At the French canton reorganisation which came into effect in March 2015, the canton was expanded from 13 to 27 communes:

 Apt
 Auribeau 
 Beaumettes
 Bonnieux
 Buoux
 Caseneuve 
 Castellet-en-Luberon 
 Gargas 
 Gignac 
 Gordes
 Goult
 Joucas
 Lacoste
 Lagarde-d'Apt 
 Lioux
 Ménerbes
 Murs
 Oppède
 Roussillon
 Rustrel 
 Saignon 
 Saint-Martin-de-Castillon 
 Saint-Pantaléon
 Saint-Saturnin-lès-Apt 
 Sivergues 
 Viens 
 Villars

References

Apt